The Max Delbrück Center for Molecular Medicine in the Helmholtz Association (MDC) in Berlin, Germany is one of the sixteen research centers of the Helmholtz Association of German Research Centres. 

MDC is member of EU-LIFE, an alliance of leading life sciences research centres in Europe.

The Center
The Max Delbrück Center was founded in January 1992 as the successor to the Zentralinstitut für Molekularbiologie which depended on the German Academy of Sciences Berlin until 1990. The center is named after Berlin-born Nobel prize laureate and biophysicist Max Delbrück. The institute combines basic research in Molecular Biology with clinical research, with a focus on multi-organ diseases such as heart failure.

The following four areas are central research topics:
 Cardiovascular and metabolic diseases
 Cancer research
 Function and dysfunction of the nervous system
 Molecular systems biology

The current interim Scientific Director is Dr. Thomas Sommer. He is a member of the Board of Directors of the German Center for Cardiovascular Research (DZHK).

Accolades
The MDC was ranked 14th in the Thompson Reuters list of the world's 20 best research institutes for molecular biology and genetics, based on its publication record.

Max Delbrück Medal
The Max Delbrück Medal has been awarded annually by the Center since its foundation and is presented in Berlin to an outstanding scientist on the occasion of the annual "Berlin Lecture on Molecular Medicine", which the MDC organizes together with other Berlin research institutions and Bayer HealthCare. The award recipient usually delivers a lecture after the award.

See also
Universities and research institutions in Berlin

References

External links

Buildings and structures in Berlin
Genetics in Germany
Medical research institutes in Germany
Medical and health organisations based in Berlin
Molecular biology institutes
Research institutes established in 1992